There are several municipalities and communities that have the name Höchstetten:

Höchstetten, Germany, in the municipality of Ansbach, Bavaria
Höchstetten, Switzerland, in the Canton of Bern